The following outline is provided as an overview of and topical guide to Newfoundland and Labrador.

Newfoundland and Labrador – the most easterly province of Canada. It comprises the island of Newfoundland, mainland Labrador, and over 7,000 small islands. It is Canada's ninth-most populous province or territory and tenth-largest in total area. A former colony and dominion of the United Kingdom, Newfoundland gave up its independence in 1933 and became the tenth province to enter the Canadian Confederation in 1949. Its name was officially changed to Newfoundland and Labrador in 2001.

General reference 

 Pronunciation: 
 Official English name: Newfoundland and Labrador
 Official French name: Terre-Neuve-et-Labrador
 Other names:
 in Newfoundland Irish
Ikkarumikluak ("place of many shoals" for Newfoundland) and Nunatsuak ("the big land" for Labrador) in Inuttitut
Taqamkuk (Newfoundland) in Mi'kmaq
 Nicknames:
 Labrador: The Big Land
 Newfoundland: The Rock
 Common endonym(s): 
 Official endonym(s): 
 Adjectival(s): Newfoundland and Labrador
 Demonym(s): Newfoundlander, Labradorian, Newfoundlanders and Labradorians, Newfie (colloquial, may be derisive)
 Telephone area code 709

Geography 

Geography of Newfoundland and Labrador
 Newfoundland and Labrador is: a province of Canada.
 Canada is: a country
 Population of Newfoundland and Labrador: 526,702 (2016 Statistics Canada)
 Area of Newfoundland and Labrador: 405,212 km2 (156,500 sq mi)
92.3% land
7.7% water
 Atlas of Newfoundland and Labrador

Location 
 Newfoundland and Labrador is situated within the following regions:
 Northern Hemisphere, Western Hemisphere
 Americas
 North America
 Northern America
 Laurentia
 Canada
 Eastern Canada
 Canadian Shield
 Labrador Peninsula
 Appalachian Mountains
 Island of Newfoundland
 Time zones (see also Time in Canada):
  Newfoundland Time Zone (UTC−03.5) officially; Atlantic Time (UTC−04) commonly used for Labrador
 Daylight saving time (DST) observed from the 2nd Sunday in March to the 1st Sunday in November
 Extreme points of Newfoundland and Labrador
 Highest point of Newfoundland and Labrador
 Landforms of Newfoundland and Labrador (category)

Environment 

Environment of Canada
 Climate of Newfoundland and Labrador
 Ecology of Newfoundland and Labrador
 Ecozones:
Marine ecozones:
 Atlantic Marine Ecozone (south coast of Newfoundland)
 Northwest Atlantic Marine Ecozone (coastal Labrador and north coast of Newfoundland)
Terrestrial ecozones:
 Arctic Cordillera (northeastern Labrador Peninsula)
 Boreal Shield Ecozone (western interior of Newfoundland)
 Newfoundland Highland forests
 Taiga Shield Ecozone (most of Labrador)
 Geology of Newfoundland and Labrador
Geology of Newfoundland and Labrador (category)
 List of dateable fossil discoveries in Newfoundland and Labrador
 Protected areas of Newfoundland and Labrador
 Wilderness and Ecological Reserves
 National parks in Newfoundland and Labrador
 List of National Parks of Canada#Newfoundland and Labrador
 List of designated places in Newfoundland and Labrador
 List of historic places in Newfoundland and Labrador
List of historic places in Labrador
 List of National Historic Sites of Canada in Newfoundland and Labrador (46)
 Provincial parks of Newfoundland and Labrador
 Wildlife of Canada in Newfoundland and Labrador
 List of flora of Newfoundland and Labrador
 List of fauna of Newfoundland and Labrador
 Birds of Newfoundland and Labrador
 Mammals of Newfoundland

Natural geographic features 

Landforms of Newfoundland and Labrador (category)
 Fjords of Newfoundland and Labrador
 Peninsulas of Newfoundland and Labrador (category)
 List of islands of Newfoundland and Labrador
 Lakes of Newfoundland and Labrador
 List of dams and reservoirs in Newfoundland and Labrador
 Rivers of Newfoundland and Labrador
 Waterfalls of Newfoundland and Labrador
 Mountains of Newfoundland and Labrador
 Mountain ranges of Newfoundland and Labrador (category)
 Volcanoes in Newfoundland and Labrador
Volcanism of Newfoundland and Labrador (category)
Volcanoes of Newfoundland and Labrador (category)
 Valleys of Newfoundland and Labrador (category)

Heritage sites 

 World Heritage Sites in Newfoundland and Labrador (4)
 L'Anse aux Meadows
 Gros Morne National Park
 Mistaken Point Ecological Reserve
 Red Bay Basque Whaling Station
National Historic Sites in Newfoundland and Labrador

Regions 

 Labrador
 Central Labrador
 Western Labrador
 Nunatsiavut (the north coast region)
 Nunatukavut (the south coast region)
 Island of Newfoundland
South coast
 Avalon Peninsula
 Burin Peninsula
 Bonavista Peninsula
Northeast coast
 Great Northern Peninsula
 West coast
 Bay of Islands
 Bay St. George
 Bay St. George South
 Port au Port Peninsula

Administrative divisions 

 Census divisions of Newfoundland and Labrador
 List of census agglomerations in Newfoundland and Labrador
 List of census divisions of Newfoundland and Labrador
 List of communities in Newfoundland and Labrador
 List of Newfoundland and Labrador communities by population
 Newfoundland outports
 List of ghost towns in Newfoundland and Labrador
 List of municipalities in Newfoundland and Labrador
 List of Newfoundland and Labrador federal electoral districts
 Avalon
 Bonavista–Burin–Trinity
 Coast of Bays–Central–Notre Dame
 Labrador
 Long Range Mountains
 St. John's East
 St. John's South–Mount Pearl
 List of Newfoundland and Labrador provincial electoral districts
 Baie Verte–Green Bay
 Bonavista
 Burgeo–La Poile
 Burin–Grand Bank
 Cape St. Francis
 Carbonear–Trinity–Bay de Verde
 Cartwright–L'Anse au Clair
 Conception Bay East–Bell Island
 Conception Bay South
 Corner Brook
 Exploits
 Ferryland
 Fogo Island–Cape Freels
 Fortune Bay–Cape La Hune
 Gander
 Grand Falls–Windsor–Buchans
 Harbour Grace–Port de Grave
 Harbour Main
 Humber–Bay of Islands
 Humber–Gros Morne
 Labrador West
 Lake Melville
 Lewisporte–Twillingate
 Mount Pearl North
 Mount Pearl–Southlands
 Mount Scio
 Placentia–St. Mary's
 Placentia West–Bellevue
 St. Barbe–L'Anse aux Meadows
 St. George's–Humber
 St. John's Centre
 St. John's East–Quidi Vidi
 St. John's West
 Stephenville–Port au Port
 Terra Nova
 Topsail–Paradise
 Torngat Mountains
 Virginia Waters–Pleasantville
 Waterford Valley
 Windsor Lake
 List of population centres in Newfoundland and Labrador

Indian reserves 
 List of Indian reserves in Newfoundland and Labrador

Municipalities 

List of municipalities in Newfoundland and Labrador
 Population centres in Newfoundland and Labrador
 Municipalities by type
 Cities of Newfoundland and Labrador
 Capital of Newfoundland and Labrador: St. John's
 Corner Brook
 Mount Pearl
Towns in Newfoundland and Labrador
Villages in Newfoundland and Labrador
 Communities in Newfoundland and Labrador

Demography 

Demographics of Newfoundland and Labrador
 List of population centres in Newfoundland and Labrador
 Population compared to other provinces

Government and politics 

Politics of Newfoundland and Labrador
 Form of government: parliamentary constitutional monarchy
 Capital of Newfoundland and Labrador: St. John's
 Elections in Newfoundland and Labrador
 List of Newfoundland and Labrador general elections
 List of Newfoundland and Labrador by-elections
 Political parties in Newfoundland and Labrador

Government branches 

Government of Newfoundland and Labrador

Executive branch 
 Head of state: Queen in Right of Newfoundland and Labrador, Queen of Canada, Queen Elizabeth II
 Head of state's representative (Viceroy): Lieutenant Governor of Newfoundland and Labrador, Frank Fagan
 Previous lieutenant governors
 Head of government: Premier of Newfoundland and Labrador, Dwight Ball
 Previous premiers
 Premiers of Newfoundland and Labrador by time in office
 Cabinet: Executive Council of Newfoundland and Labrador
 Head of council: Lieutenant Governor in Council, as representative of the Queen in Right of Newfoundland and Labrador
 Departments of the Newfoundland and Labrador government
 Department of Advanced Education and Skills
 Department of Child, Youth and Family Services
 Department of Education and Early Childhood Development (Newfoundland and Labrador)
 Department of Environment and Conservation (Newfoundland and Labrador)
 Department of Finance (Newfoundland and Labrador)
 Department of Fisheries and Aquaculture (Newfoundland and Labrador)
 Department of Health and Community Services (Newfoundland and Labrador)
 Department of Innovation, Business and Rural Development
 Department of Justice and Public Safety (Newfoundland and Labrador)
 Department of Labrador and Aboriginal Affairs (Newfoundland and Labrador)
 Department of Natural Resources
 Geological Survey of Newfoundland and Labrador
 Department of Municipal and Intergovernmental Affairs (Newfoundland and Labrador)
 Department of Seniors, Wellness and Social Development (Newfoundland and Labrador)
 Department of Services NL
 Department of Transportation and Works (Newfoundland and Labrador)

Legislative branch 

 Parliament of Newfoundland and Labrador (unicameral):  Newfoundland and Labrador House of Assembly
Speaker of the House of Assembly of Newfoundland and Labrador: vacant
 Leader of the Opposition (Newfoundland and Labrador): Ches Crosby
 Confederation Building (Newfoundland and Labrador)
 48th General Assembly of Newfoundland and Labrador

Judicial branch 

Federal Courts of Canada
 Supreme Court of Canada
 Federal Court of Appeal
 Tax Court of Canada
 Canadian court of appeal: Newfoundland and Labrador Court of Appeal
 Superior court: Supreme Court of Newfoundland and Labrador
 Supreme Court of Newfoundland and Labrador (Court of Appeal)
 Provincial Court: Court of Newfoundland and Labrador
 The Civil Division
 The Criminal and Penal Division
 The Youth Division
 Military court: Court Martial Appeal Court of Canada

Regional relations 

 Atlantic Provinces Economic Council
 proposed Atlantic Union

International relations 
 Ireland Newfoundland Partnership

Law and order 

Law of Newfoundland and Labrador
 Bar of Newfoundland and Labrador – the provincial law society for lawyers in Newfoundland and Labrador
 Capital punishment: none.
 Newfoundland and Labrador, as with all of Canada, does not have capital punishment.
 Canada eliminated the death penalty for murder on July 14, 1976.
 Constitution of Newfoundland and Labrador
 Criminal justice system of Newfoundland and Labrador
 Crime in Newfoundland and Labrador (category)
 Organized crime in Newfoundland and Labrador
 Human rights in Newfoundland and Labrador
 LGBT rights in Newfoundland and Labrador
 Same-sex marriage in Newfoundland and Labrador
 Law enforcement
 Royal Newfoundland Constabulary (urban areas such as St. John's, Corner brook and Labrador West)
 Local municipal police forces (where such exist)
 Royal Canadian Mounted Police (contracted to patrol the rest of the province)
 Correctional services in Newfoundland and Labrador

Military 

Canadian Forces
(Being a part of Canada, Newfoundland and Labrador does not have its own military.)
 Canadian Forces bases in Newfoundland and Labrador (category)

Local government 

Local government in Newfoundland and Labrador
 List of mayors of St. John's, Newfoundland and Labrador

History 

History of Newfoundland and Labrador

History, by period 
History of Newfoundland and Labrador by period (category)
Beothuk
Newfoundland Colony#History
Dominion of Newfoundland#History

History, by region 
Labrador#History
Newfoundland (island)#History
Province of Avalon#History
St. John's, Newfoundland and Labrador#History

History, by subject 

Abandoned colonies
L'Anse aux Meadows, possibly Leifsbudir, 1000
South Falkland, 1623
 Disasters in Newfoundland and Labrador (category)
Economic history of Newfoundland and Labrador
History of Fisheries of Newfoundland and Labrador
 Collapse of the Atlantic northwest cod fishery
 Turbot War
 Migratory Fishery of Labrador
 History of Basque whaling#Newfoundland and Labrador
 History of the petroleum industry in Canada (frontier exploration and development)
 Military history of Newfoundland and Labrador (category)
 Battle of Placentia (1692)
 Newfoundland Campaign (1744)

Culture 

Culture of Newfoundland and Labrador (category)
 Buildings and structures in Newfoundland and Labrador (category)
 Architecture of St. John's, Newfoundland and Labrador
 List of buildings in St. John's, Newfoundland and Labrador
 List of tallest buildings in St. John's, Newfoundland and Labrador
 Cuisine of Newfoundland and Labrador (category)
 Newfoundland Screech
Restaurants in Newfoundland and Labrador (category)
 Festivals in Newfoundland and Labrador (category)
 Heritage Foundation of Newfoundland and Labrador
 Mass media in Newfoundland and Labrador (category)
 Media in St. John's, Newfoundland and Labrador
 Museums in Newfoundland and Labrador
 Order of precedence in Newfoundland and Labrador
 People from Newfoundland and Labrador (category)
 English Canadians#Newfoundland (and Labrador)
 Irish Newfoundlanders
 Franco-Newfoundlanders
 NunatuKavut people
 Mushuau Innu First Nation
 Qalipu Mi'kmaq First Nation Band
 Prostitution in Newfoundland and Labrador
 Public holidays in Newfoundland and Labrador
Memorial Day (Newfoundland and Labrador)
 Public libraries in Newfoundland and Labrador
 Provincial Archives of Newfoundland and Labrador
 Regional culture in Newfoundland and Labrador (culture by region)
 (list)
 Scouting and Guiding in Newfoundland and Labrador
Languages
 Newfoundland English
 Newfoundland Irish and Irish language in Newfoundland
 Newfoundland French

Art 
 Art of Newfoundland and Labrador
 Cinema of Newfoundland and Labrador (category)
 Dance of Newfoundland and Labrador
 Humour of Newfoundland and Labrador
 Literature of Newfoundland and Labrador
 Music of Newfoundland and Labrador
 List of musicians from Newfoundland and Labrador
 Television shows filmed in Newfoundland and Labrador (category)
List of television stations in Newfoundland and Labrador
 Theatre in Newfoundland and Labrador

Religion 

Religion in Newfoundland and Labrador – largely Protestant, with non-Christian religions making up less than half a percent of the population

 Christianity in Newfoundland and Labrador
 Anglicanism in Newfoundland and Labrador
 Diocese of Central Newfoundland
 Diocese of Eastern Newfoundland and Labrador
 Diocese of Western Newfoundland
 Roman Catholicism in Newfoundland and Labrador
 Roman Catholic Archdiocese of St. John's, Newfoundland
 Roman Catholic Diocese of Corner Brook and Labrador
 Roman Catholic Diocese of Grand Falls
 Irreligion in Canada
 Islam in Canada
 Masjid-an-Noor, Newfoundland
 Hinduism in Canada
 St. John's Hindu Temple
 Judaism in Newfoundland and Labrador
 Beth El Synagogue, Newfoundland
 Buddhism in Canada
 Sikhism in Canada

Sports 

Sports in Newfoundland and Labrador
 Curling in Newfoundland and Labrador
 Curling clubs in Newfoundland and Labrador
 Ice Hockey in Newfoundland and Labrador
 Hockey Newfoundland and Labrador
 Ice hockey teams in Newfoundland and Labrador
  (category)
 Rugby in Newfoundland and Labrador
 Cricket in Newfoundland and Labrador
 Association football in Newfoundland and Labrador
 Gaelic games in Newfoundland and Labrador
 Sports teams in Newfoundland and Labrador (category)

Symbols 

Symbols of Newfoundland and Labrador
 Coat of arms of Newfoundland and Labrador
 Flag of Newfoundland and Labrador
 Great Seal of Newfoundland and Labrador
 Provincial flower: pitcher plant
 Provincial bird: Atlantic puffin
 Provincial tree: black spruce
 Provincial animal: caribou
 Provincial mineral: Labradorite
 Provincial motto:  – "Seek ye first the kingdom of God" (Matthew 6:33)
 Provincial anthem: "Ode to Newfoundland"
 Provincial capital: St. John's

Economy and infrastructure 

Economy of Newfoundland and Labrador
 Economic rank (by nominal GDP) – This ranking shows only the Rank of Canada, the country in which is located Newfoundland and Labrador
 Agriculture in Newfoundland and Labrador
 Fishing industry in Canada
 Cod fishing in Newfoundland
 Grand Banks
 Hunting in Newfoundland
 Seal hunting
 Forestry in Newfoundland and Labrador
 Banking in Newfoundland and Labrador
 Telecommunications in Newfoundland and Labrador
 Internet in Newfoundland and Labrador
 Radio stations in Newfoundland and Labrador
 Broadcasting Corporation of Newfoundland
 Television stations in Newfoundland and Labrador
 Companies in Newfoundland and Labrador (category)
 Currency of Newfoundland and Labrador – as a province, Newfoundland and Labrador uses the currency of Canada.
 Energy in Newfoundland and Labrador (category)
 Environmental and energy policy of Newfoundland and Labrador
 Electricity sector in Newfoundland and Labrador
 Electrical generating stations in Newfoundland and Labrador
 Hydroelectric generating stations in Newfoundland and Labrador
 Wind farms in Newfoundland and Labrador
 Biomass and fossil fuel power stations in Newfoundland and Labrador
 Hydroelectricity in Canada#Newfoundland and Labrador
 Newfoundland and Labrador Hydro
 Oil industry in Newfoundland and Labrador
 Oil fields:  Hebron-Ben Nevis, Hibernia, Terra Nova, and White Rose
 Health care in Newfoundland and Labrador
 List of hospitals in Newfoundland and Labrador
 Health and Community Services Western Region
 Emergency medical services in Newfoundland and Labrador
 Mining in Newfoundland and Labrador (category)
 Central Mineral Belt, Labrador
 Mines in Newfoundland and Labrador (category)
 Tourism in Canada#Newfoundland and Labrador
 Water supply and sanitation in Newfoundland and Labrador
 Research & Development Corporation Newfoundland and Labrador

Transport 

Transport in Newfoundland and Labrador (category)
 Air transport in Newfoundland and Labrador
 Airlines of Newfoundland and Labrador
 Airports in Newfoundland and Labrador
 Rail transport in Newfoundland and Labrador (category)
Newfoundland Railway (defunct)
Quebec North Shore and Labrador Railway
Western Labrador Rail Services
 Road transport in Newfoundland and Labrador
 Vehicle registration plates of Newfoundland and Labrador
 Roads in Newfoundland and Labrador
 Highways in Newfoundland and Labrador
 Newfoundland and Labrador Route 1 – Trans-Canada Highway
 Trans-Labrador Highway
 Bus transport in Newfoundland and Labrador (category)
 Public transport in Newfoundland and Labrador (category)
 Water transport in Newfoundland and Labrador (category)
 Ferry transport in Newfoundland and Labrador (category)
 List of lighthouses in Newfoundland and Labrador

Education 

Education in Newfoundland and Labrador (category)
 Primary education in Newfoundland and Labrador
 School districts in Newfoundland and Labrador
 Eastern School District of Newfoundland and Labrador
 Grade school in Newfoundland and Labrador
 High school in Newfoundland and Labrador
 Higher education in Newfoundland and Labrador
 Public colleges in Newfoundland and Labrador
 Museums in Newfoundland and Labrador

See also 

 Index of Newfoundland and Labrador-related articles
 Outline of geography
 Outline of North America
 Outline of Canada
 Outline of Alberta
 Outline of British Columbia
 Outline of Manitoba
 Outline of New Brunswick
 Outline of Nova Scotia
 Outline of Ontario
 Outline of Quebec
 Outline of Prince Edward Island
 Outline of Saskatchewan

 National War Memorial (Newfoundland)
 List of people from Newfoundland and Labrador
 Encyclopedia of Newfoundland and Labrador
 Auditor General of Newfoundland and Labrador
 List of Newfoundland and Labrador senators
 Order of Newfoundland and Labrador
 Vehicle registration plates of Newfoundland and Labrador
 Elections Newfoundland and Labrador
 Newfoundland and Labrador Federation of Labour
 Newfoundland and Labrador Medical Association
 Newfoundland School Society
 Newfoundland and Labrador Youth Parliament

Categories

 :Category:Accidental deaths in Newfoundland and Labrador
 :Category:Aerospace museums in Newfoundland and Labrador
 :Category:Airports in Newfoundland and Labrador
 :Category:Anglican church buildings in Newfoundland and Labrador
 :Category:Art museums and galleries in Newfoundland and Labrador
 :Category:Aviation in Newfoundland and Labrador
 :Category:Bays of Newfoundland and Labrador
 :Category:Bike paths in Newfoundland and Labrador
 :Category:Bodies of water of Newfoundland and Labrador
 :Category:Borders of Newfoundland and Labrador
 :Category:Buildings and structures in Newfoundland and Labrador
 :Category:Bus transport in Newfoundland and Labrador
 :Category:Canadian Forces bases in Newfoundland and Labrador
 :Category:Deaths from cancer in Newfoundland and Labrador
 :Category:Candidates in Newfoundland and Labrador provincial elections
 :Category:Census divisions of Newfoundland and Labrador
 :Category:Christianity in Newfoundland and Labrador
 :Category:Churches in Newfoundland and Labrador
 :Category:Cinema of Newfoundland and Labrador
 :Category:Cities in Newfoundland and Labrador
 :Category:Communications in Newfoundland and Labrador
 :Category:Companies based in Newfoundland and Labrador
 :Category:Crime in Newfoundland and Labrador
 :Category:Crown corporations of Newfoundland and Labrador
 :Category:Culture of Newfoundland and Labrador
 :Category:Curling in Newfoundland and Labrador
 :Category:Dams in Newfoundland and Labrador
 :Category:Death in Newfoundland and Labrador
 :Category:Deaths by firearm in Newfoundland and Labrador
 :Category:Defunct airports in Newfoundland and Labrador
 :Category:Defunct ice hockey leagues in Newfoundland and Labrador
 :Category:Deputy premiers of Newfoundland and Labrador
 :Category:Designated places in Newfoundland and Labrador
 :Category:Disasters in Newfoundland and Labrador
 :Category:Disease-related deaths in Newfoundland and Labrador
 :Category:Earthquakes in Newfoundland and Labrador
 :Category:Economy of Newfoundland and Labrador
 :Category:Education in Newfoundland and Labrador
 :Category:Elections in Newfoundland and Labrador
 :Category:Elementary schools in Newfoundland and Labrador
 :Category:Energy in Newfoundland and Labrador
 :Category:Ethnic groups in Newfoundland and Labrador
 :Category:Executive Council of Newfoundland and Labrador
 :Category:Ferries of Newfoundland and Labrador
 :Category:Ferry companies of Newfoundland and Labrador
 :Category:Ferry transport in Newfoundland and Labrador
 :Category:Festivals in Newfoundland and Labrador
 :Category:Films set in Newfoundland and Labrador
 :Category:Films shot in Newfoundland and Labrador
 :Category:Finance ministers of Newfoundland and Labrador
 :Category:Flora of Newfoundland
 :Category:Forts in Newfoundland and Labrador
 :Category:Geography of Newfoundland and Labrador
 :Category:Geology of Newfoundland and Labrador
 :Category:Ghost towns in Newfoundland and Labrador
 :Category:Golf clubs and courses in Newfoundland and Labrador
 :Category:Government of Newfoundland and Labrador
 :Category:Health in Newfoundland and Labrador
 :Category:Health regions of Newfoundland and Labrador
 :Category:Heritage sites in Newfoundland and Labrador
 :Category:High schools in Newfoundland and Labrador
 :Category:Hiking trails in Newfoundland and Labrador
 :Category:History of Newfoundland and Labrador
 :Category:History of Newfoundland and Labrador by location
 :Category:Hospitals in Newfoundland and Labrador
 :Category:Hotels in Newfoundland and Labrador
 :Category:Houses in Newfoundland and Labrador
 :Category:Hydroelectric power stations in Newfoundland and Labrador
 :Category:Ice hockey in Newfoundland and Labrador
 :Category:Ice hockey leagues in Newfoundland and Labrador
 :Category:Ice hockey teams in Newfoundland and Labrador
 :Category:Infectious disease deaths in Newfoundland and Labrador
 :Category:International Baccalaureate schools in Newfoundland and Labrador
 :Category:Islands of Newfoundland and Labrador
 :Category:Jews and Judaism in Newfoundland and Labrador
 :Category:Judges in Newfoundland and Labrador
 :Category:Lakes of Newfoundland and Labrador
 :Category:Landforms of Newfoundland and Labrador
 :Category:Law enforcement agencies of Newfoundland and Labrador
 :Category:Lawyers in Newfoundland and Labrador
 :Category:Leaders of the Progressive Conservative Party of Newfoundland and Labrador
 :Category:Lieutenant Governors of Newfoundland and Labrador
 :Category:Lighthouses in Newfoundland and Labrador
 :Category:Lists of historic places in Newfoundland and Labrador
 :Category:Lists of mayors of places in Newfoundland and Labrador
 :Category:Local government in Newfoundland and Labrador
 :Category:Magazines published in Newfoundland and Labrador
 :Category:Maps of Newfoundland and Labrador provincial electoral districts
 :Category:Maritime museums in Newfoundland and Labrador
 :Category:Mayors of places in Newfoundland and Labrador
 :Category:Mass media by city in Newfoundland and Labrador
 :Category:Mass media in Newfoundland and Labrador
 :Category:Members of the Executive Council of Newfoundland and Labrador
 :Category:Members of the Order of Newfoundland and Labrador
 :Category:Metropolitan areas of Newfoundland and Labrador
 :Category:Middle schools in Newfoundland and Labrador
 :Category:Military forts in Newfoundland and Labrador
 :Category:Mines in Newfoundland and Labrador
 :Category:Mining communities in Newfoundland and Labrador
 :Category:Mining in Newfoundland and Labrador
 :Category:Monuments and memorials in Newfoundland and Labrador
 :Category:Mosques in Newfoundland and Labrador
 :Category:Mountain ranges of Newfoundland and Labrador
 :Category:Mountains of Newfoundland and Labrador
 :Category:Municipal councils in Newfoundland and Labrador
 :Category:Municipal elections in Newfoundland and Labrador
 :Category:Museums in Newfoundland and Labrador
 :Category:Music festivals in Newfoundland and Labrador
 :Category:Narrow gauge railways in Newfoundland and Labrador
 :Category:National Historic Sites in Newfoundland and Labrador
 :Category:Natural disasters in Newfoundland and Labrador
 :Category:Natural history of Newfoundland and Labrador
 :Category:Neighbourhoods in Newfoundland and Labrador
 :Category:Newspapers published in Newfoundland and Labrador
 :Category:Novels set in Newfoundland and Labrador
 :Category:Oil-fired power stations in Newfoundland and Labrador
 :Category:Organizations based in Newfoundland and Labrador
 :Category:Parks in Newfoundland and Labrador
 :Category:Passenger rail transport in Newfoundland and Labrador
 :Category:Passenger railways in Newfoundland and Labrador
 :Category:Peninsulas of Newfoundland and Labrador
 :Category:People by populated place in Newfoundland and Labrador
 :Category:People murdered in Newfoundland and Labrador
 :Category:Political history of Newfoundland and Labrador
 :Category:Politicians in Newfoundland and Labrador
 :Category:Politics of Newfoundland and Labrador
 :Category:Populated places in Newfoundland and Labrador
 :Category:Power stations in Newfoundland and Labrador
 :Category:Premiers of Newfoundland and Labrador
 :Category:Private schools in Newfoundland and Labrador
 :Category:Progressive Conservative Party of Newfoundland and Labrador
 :Category:Progressive Conservative Party of Newfoundland and Labrador politicians
 :Category:Protected areas of Newfoundland and Labrador
 :Category:Provincial political parties in Newfoundland and Labrador
 :Category:Provincial symbols of Newfoundland and Labrador
 :Category:Public transport in Newfoundland and Labrador
 :Category:Radio stations in Newfoundland and Labrador
 :Category:Rail trails in Newfoundland and Labrador
 :Category:Rail transport in Newfoundland and Labrador
 :Category:Railway museums in Newfoundland and Labrador
 :Category:Referendums in Newfoundland and Labrador
 :Category:Religion in Newfoundland and Labrador
 :Category:Religious buildings and structures in Newfoundland and Labrador
 :Category:Restaurants in Newfoundland and Labrador
 :Category:Rivers of Newfoundland and Labrador
 :Category:Roads in Newfoundland and Labrador
 :Category:Catholic Church in Newfoundland and Labrador
 :Category:Roman Catholic churches in Newfoundland and Labrador
 :Category:Roman Catholic schools in Newfoundland and Labrador
 :Category:School districts in Newfoundland and Labrador
 :Category:Schools in Newfoundland and Labrador
 :Category:Ships built in Newfoundland and Labrador
 :Category:Shopping malls in Newfoundland and Labrador
 :Category:Soccer clubs in Newfoundland and Labrador
 :Category:Soccer in Newfoundland and Labrador
 :Category:Sport in Newfoundland and Labrador
 :Category:Sport in Newfoundland and Labrador by city
 :Category:Sports governing bodies in Newfoundland and Labrador
 :Category:Sports teams in Newfoundland and Labrador
 :Category:Sports venues in Newfoundland and Labrador
 :Category:Sportspeople in Newfoundland and Labrador
 :Category:Synagogues in Newfoundland and Labrador
 :Category:Television shows filmed in Newfoundland and Labrador
 :Category:Television shows set in Newfoundland and Labrador
 :Category:Television stations in Newfoundland and Labrador
 :Category:Theatres in Newfoundland and Labrador
 :Category:Tourism in Newfoundland and Labrador
 :Category:Towns in Newfoundland and Labrador
 :Category:Transit agencies in Newfoundland and Labrador
 :Category:Transport in Newfoundland and Labrador
 :Category:Transport museums in Newfoundland and Labrador
 :Category:Uninhabited islands of Newfoundland and Labrador
 :Category:Universities and colleges in Newfoundland and Labrador
 :Category:Valleys of Newfoundland and Labrador
 :Category:Tourist attractions in Newfoundland and Labrador
 :Category:Volcanism of Newfoundland and Labrador
 :Category:Volcanoes of Newfoundland and Labrador
 :Category:Water transport in Newfoundland and Labrador
 :Category:Waterfalls of Newfoundland and Labrador
 :Category:Weekly newspapers published in Newfoundland and Labrador
 :Category:Women in Newfoundland and Labrador
 :Category:Women in Newfoundland and Labrador politics

Largest cities

References

External links 

 Government of Newfoundland and Labrador
 Centre for Newfoundland Studies
 
 Official Tourism Website

Newfoundland and Labrador
 
 Newfoundland and Labrador-related lists
Outlines_of_Canadian_provinces_and_territories